Charles G. Fisher  (born as Charles G. Fish) (March 10, 1852 – February 18, 1917) was a 19th-century professional baseball third baseman. He played for the Kansas City Cowboys and the Chicago Browns in the Union Association in eleven games in June–July 1884. Fisher is the only Major League Baseball player to have died in Alaska.

External links

Major League Baseball third basemen
Chicago Browns/Pittsburgh Stogies players
19th-century baseball players
Baseball players from Massachusetts
1852 births
1917 deaths
Portland (minor league baseball) players
Haverhill (minor league baseball) players
Newburyport Clamdiggers players
Biddeford (minor league baseball) players